De Viris Illustribus (On Illustrious Men) is a collection of short biographies of 135 authors, written in Latin, by the 4th-century Latin Church Father Jerome.  He completed this work at Bethlehem in 392–393 AD.  The work consists of a prologue plus 135 chapters, each consisting of a brief biography.  Jerome himself is the subject of the final chapter.  A Greek version of the book, possibly by the same Sophronius who is the subject of Chapter 134, also survives.  Many biographies take as their subject figures important in Christian Church history and pay especial attention to their careers as writers.  It "was written as an apologetic work to prove that the Church had produced learned men."  The book was dedicated to Flavius Lucius Dexter, who served as high chamberlain to Theodosius I and as praetorian prefect to Honorius.  Dexter was the son of Saint Pacianus, who is eulogized in the work.

Contents
Listed below are the subjects of Jerome's 135 biographies.  The numbers given are the chapter numbers found in editions.

1. Simon Peter
2. James the Just
3. Matthew
4. Jude
5. Paul
6. Barnabas
7. Luke
8. Mark
9. John
10. Hermas
11. Philo the Jew
12. Lucius Annaeus Seneca
13. Josephus
14. Justus
15. Clement
16. Ignatius of Antioch
17. Polycarp
18. Papias
19. Quadratus
20. Aristides
21. Agrippa
22. Hegesippus
23. Justin
24. Melito of Asia
25. Theophilus
26. Apollinaris
27. Dionysius of Corinth
28. Pinytus of Crete
29. Tatian
30. Philip of Crete
31. Musanus
32. Modestus
33. Bardesanes of Mesopotamia
34. Victor
35. Irenaeus
36. Pantaenus
37. Rhodo
38. Clemens
39. Miltiades
40. Apollonius
41. Serapion
42. Apollonius
43. Theophilus
44. Bacchylus
45. Polycrates
46. Heraclitus
47. Maximus
48. Candidus
49. Appion
50. Sextus
51. Arabianus
52. Judas
53. Tertullian
54. Origen
55. Ammonius
56. Ambrose
57. Trypho
58. Minucius Felix
59. Gaius 
60. Beryllus
61. Hippolytus
62. Alexander of Cappadocia
63. Julius Africanus
64. Geminus
65. Theodorus (Gregory of Neocaesarea)
66. Cornelius
67. Cyprian of Africa
68. Pontius
69. Dionysius of Alexandria
70. Novatianus
71. Malchion
72. Archelaus
73. Anatolius of Alexandria
74. Victorinus
75. Pamphilus the Presbyter
76. Pierius
77. Lucianus
78. Phileas
79. Arnobius
80. Firmianus (Lactantius)
81. Eusebius of Caesarea
82. Reticius
83. Methodius
84. Juvencus
85. Eustathius
86. Marcellus
87. Athanasius
88. Anthony
89. Basil of Ancyra
90. Theodorus
91. Eusebius of Emesa
92. Triphylius
93. Donatus
94. Asterius
95. Lucifer of Cagliari
96. Eusebius of Sardinia
97. 
98. Acacius
99. Serapion
100. Hilary
101. Victorinus
102. Titus
103. Damasus
104. Apollinaris
105. Gregory of Elvira
106. Pacianus
107. Photinus
108. Phoebadius
109. Didymus
110. Optatus
111. Acilius Severus
112. Cyril of Jerusalem
113. Euzoius
114. Epiphanius
115. Ephraim
116. Basil of Caesarea
117. Gregory of Nazianzen
118. Lucius
119. Diodorus
120. Eunomius
121. Priscillianus
122. Latronianus
123. Tiberianus
124. Ambrose of Milan
125. Evagrius
126. Ambrose, disciple of Didymus
127. Maximus
128. Gregory of Nyssa
129. John the presbyter  =John Chrysostom 
130. Gelasius
131. Theotimus
132. Dexter
133. Amphilochius
134. Sophronius
135. Jerome the presbyter

Jerome's account of his own literary career

At the conclusion of De Viris Illustribus, Jerome provided his own biography as the latest example of the scholarly work of Christians. In Chapter 135, Jerome summarized his career to date:

Editions
Jerome and Gennadius: Lives of Illustrious Men, English translation by Ernest Cushing Richardson
Jerome's De Viris Illustribus: Latin text (includes an informative introduction, in Latin)
Jerome's De Viris Illustribus: Greek version

Notes

References
De Viris Illustribus (On Illustrious Men) - Full English version.
The Catholic Encyclopedia, Published 1910 in New York by Robert Appleton Company.
This article incorporates text from the Encyclopædia Britannica Eleventh Edition, a publication now in the public domain.

External links

Jerome's De Viris Illustribus of Matthew, Mark, Luke
 
Catholic Encyclopedia: Gennadius of Marseilles (continuator of Jerome's De viris illustribus)

4th-century Christian texts
4th-century history books
4th-century Latin books
Biographies about writers
Christian apologetic works
4th-century documents
Works by Jerome